Mike Woodard (born February 20, 1959) is an American politician who has served in the North Carolina Senate from the 22nd district since 2013. He represents areas of Durham, Granville, and Person counties.

Before being elected to the state Senate, Woodard served on the Durham City Council from 2005 to 2013. Since 1996, Woodard has been an administrator at Duke University and the Duke University Health System. He has served as a trustee of the Durham Arts Council as well as its president.

References

External links

1959 births
Living people
Democratic Party North Carolina state senators
21st-century American politicians